The Workers' Party (PT) is a Trotskyist political party in Paraguay.

History
The party was established on 19 March 1989. It first contested national elections in 1991, when it received 0.6% of the vote in the Constitutional Assembly elections, finishing sixth but failing to win a seat. It again failed to win a seat in the 1993 general elections, in which its candidate for president, Eduardo Arce, finished fourth with 0.2%. The party did not contest the 1998 or 2003 elections, but had a candidate in 2008 presidential elections. However, party candidate, Julio López finished last with just 0.1% of the vote.

References

Communist parties in Paraguay
Political parties established in 1989
Political parties in Paraguay
Trotskyist organizations in South America